Live in Concert is a live album by Ray Charles released in 1965 by ABC-Paramount Records.  The recording was made at the Shrine Auditorium in Los Angeles, California in September, 1964 following a tour of Japan.

In 2011, the record was remastered and reissued on CD with new liner notes and previously unreleased tracks, extending the record to well over an hour's worth of music.

Original LP track listing
LP side A:
 "Opening" – 0:35
 "Swing A Little Taste" (Julian Priester) – 3:35
 "I Got a Woman" (Charles, Richard) – 6:10
 "Margie" (Con Conrad, Davis, J. Russel Robinson) – 2:39
 "You Don't Know Me" (Eddy Arnold, Cindy Walker) – 3:14
 "Hide nor Hair" (Percy Mayfield) – 2:57
LP side B:
 "Baby, Don't You Cry" (Buddy Johnson, Washington) – 2:35
 "Makin' Whoopee" (Walter Donaldson, Gus Kahn) – 6:17
 "Hallelujah I Love Her So" (Charles) – 2:55
 "Don't Set Me Free" (Agnes Jones, Freddy James) – 3:58
 "What'd I Say" (Charles) – 4:30
 "Finale" – 1:55

2011 reissue track listing
 "Opening" – 0:39
 "Swing A Little Taste" (Priester) – 3:37
 "One Mint Julep" (Toombs) – 2:58
 "I Got A Woman" – 6:08
 "Georgia On My Mind" (Carmichael, Gorrell) – 7:26
 "Margie" – 2:17
 "You Don't Know Me" – 3:15
 "Hide Nor Hair" – 2:54
 "That Lucky Old Sun" (Gillespie, Smith) – 5:12
 "Baby, Don't You Cry" – 2:40
 "In The Evening (When The Sun Goes Down)" (Carr, Ledbetter, Raye) – 6:50
 "Hallelujah, I Love Her So" – 2:58
 "Makin' Whoopee" – 6:10
 "Busted" (Howard) – 2:23
 "Don't Set Me Free" – 3:49
 "Two Ton Tessie" (Handman, Turk) – 4:42
 "My Baby (I Love Her, Yes I Do)" (Charles) – 5:01
 "What'd I Say" – 4:25
 "Finale" – 1:56

Personnel
Ray Charles – piano, Hammond organ (on "One Mint Julep", "Georgia On My Mind", "That Lucky Old Sun" and the intro to "What'd I Say?"), vocals
Oliver Beener – trumpet
Wallace Davenport – trumpet
Philip Guilbeau – trumpet
John Hunt – trumpet, flugelhorn
Henderson Chambers – trombone
James Harbert – trombone
Frederic "Keg" Johnson – trombone
Julian Priester – trombone
Bennie "Hank" Crawford – alto saxophone
William "Buddy" Pearson – alto saxophone, flute
David "Fathead" Newman – tenor saxophone
Leroy "Hog" Cooper – baritone saxophone
Don Peake – guitar
Edgar Willis – bass
Wilbert Hogan – drums
The Raelettes – backing vocals
Gwen Berry
Lillian Forte
Pat Lyle
Darlene MacRae
Technical
Wally Heider – engineer, recording 
Ray Hearne - photography

References

External links
[ Album review and track info at Allmusic.com]
ABC Paramount Records 500
Rhino Handmade RHM2 7826 (Ray Charles in Concert – 2003 compilation)
Concord CRE31439

Ray Charles live albums
1965 live albums
ABC Records live albums
Albums produced by Sid Feller